Antoun Saad was a Lebanese military official, born in Toula el-Jebbi, a small town in Qada'a, Zgharta, in 1910. He grew up in a middle-class family and married Barsita Mikhael Saad (born 1926). They had six children: Bassam, retired Brigadier General, Hanna, a Business Engineer, Samir, who died at a young age due to malpractice, Elias, a Civil Engineer, Noha, an Endocrinologist, Rita, who died in her early twenties after losing a battle with brain cancer, and Fouad, an Industrial Engineer.

Education 
Saad went to school in the surrounding towns and decided that when he was 18, he would be a monk. To this end, he moved to the monastery in the town of Shebbanieh in Mount Lebanon, but soon after he had arrived, he fell out with the abbot. After a little while, he returned to Tripoli, where he enrolled at the Collège des Frères.

Career 
He joined the Lebanese Army in 1930 and was stationed in the military barracks of Andaket in Akkar. He was promoted to the rank of sergeant in 1934 when he enrolled at the Aleppo Military Academy. He finished his post as a warrant officer two years later, in 1937 he was raised to the position of 'Lieutenant.' Saad moved across various sectors during his military service. The Levantine Regiment, the nucleus of the Lebanese Army, had been transformed from Sniper Regiment 1. He was appointed the second Sniper Regiment Commander from 1948 to 1950.

Relationship with President Chehab 

His meeting and friendship with Fouad Chehab was the path that led Antoun Saad to the Second Bureau. The two met for the first time in 1936 at the Aleppo Military Academy, when Saad passed a shooting test in front of a military commission of which the then Captain Fouad Chehab was a member.

Their second meeting took place in the Marjeyoun barracks in South Lebanon following a clash between a Lebanese and a French soldier. Saad, who was in charge, resolved the conflict by sending the former to jail and the latter to the hospital. His racist conduct infuriated Chehab, who begged him to handle the two equally and to put them all in the hospital, but Saad was courageous enough to show Chehab that the French soldier was at fault, and thus deserved to go to prison. This act of boldness placed Saad in high regard for Chehab.

The Battle of al-Malikiyah between the Lebanese and Israeli armies in 1948 offered the third occasion for their encounter.

The Deuxième Bureau 
Having met and made friends with Saad, Chehab, who had become Commander of the Army, agreed to name him as Head of the Second Bureau by the end of February 1952.

During his tenure at the Second Bureau, Saad was an active player in shaping or participating in major events taking place in the region. From 1954 onwards, he set out to formulate a strategy to reform Lebanon 's military intelligence service, seeking the opinion of experienced French intelligence officers. To this end, it expanded its sources of intelligence, which were no longer limited to feedback from its monthly paid personal informants, but extended to include key stakeholders operating in the region. Gradually, he established a wide network of contacts with prominent Lebanese leaders, high-ranking businessmen, merchants, industrialists, bankers, and businessmen. His crucial position in power helped him attract certain individuals who would reveal information to him in return for services and security, particularly after he became recognized as President Fouad Chehab 's closest statesman. It was under Antoun Saad that the Second Bureau started to play an important role.

Originally, the military intelligence team consisted of no more than 15 non-commissioned officers, some of whom would be monitoring the Palestinian camps and others would be investigating Israeli-sponsored assassination attempts. Administrative activities were limited to a variety of operations helping pro-Chehab politicians and seeking to increase their influence.

But, starting in 1959, Saad began to expand his intelligence personnel. New Second Bureau branches were established in all five Mohafazas to gather information, a mission that had previously been delegated to the leadership of the military regions, in collaboration with an officer stationed in the Second Bureau and responsible for maintaining security. Soon afterwards, the branches were granted considerable rights and enjoyed greater patronage from the social groups and the dignitaries, as they offered help and were versatile in issuing arms licences. Saad recruited highly skilled officers at the intelligence office and entrusted them with the management of the Mohafaza branch.

Following the failure of the coup d'état attempted by the Syrian Social Nationalist Party on the night of 30/31 December 1961, Antoun Saad plotted another coup.

The Head of the Second Bureau has agreed to open a new chapter in its intelligence operations by tightening the military's hold on public life and reforming its infrastructure to ensure a higher degree of security and internal stability, with greater access to financial resources.

The strategy was to bridge all the gaps between the military and political classes and to enable military intelligence to keep up with the latest political news and developments in Lebanon.

He thus created a transformational transition for intelligence work which, until that time, had often concentrated on small and meaningless street news, such as revealing who cursed the President of the Republic or attacked the Second Bureau or complained about the ruling class. Saad changed the role of the Bureau to one concerned with the investigation and collection of information. Nor was its mission limited solely to this: the Second Bureau also engaged in the analysis of the material, the evaluation of its dimensions and the anticipation of developments in order to avoid possible consequences."Absolute Security" was a core component of Antoun Saad 's slogan. To him, this meant placing everything associated with the absolute existence of security under close observation, a generalization that could be interpreted in such a way as to place politics, economy, sociology and culture at the core of the definition, requirements and terms of security. Through this way, intelligence strengthened its hold on the state and the nation, which, through turn, had significant consequences and had negative results, which were later transformed into the indictment of intelligence officers following the 1970 parliamentary elections, a move that was criticized by many for exposing Lebanon to threats and contributing to the civil war in Lebanon.

Retirement 
Antoun Saad served at the head of the Second Bureau until President Chehab's term of office had ended. He was appointed commander of the Mount Lebanon Military Region on August 27, 1964, and his military service was extended by a further year until his retirement on July 1, 1971.

Upon retirement, Saad kept several secrets to himself. Nevertheless, when the Civil War broke out and his asthma worsened, he resorted to burning all the classified documents  prior to his death on 26 June 1977 at the age of 67.

References 

https://www.refworld.org/docid/4784deed10.html
https://www.refworld.org/docid/47d6548ac.html
https://www.refworld.org/docid/4784deed10.html
https://monthlymagazine.com/article-desc_1324_
https://monthlymagazine.com/article-desc_1352_
https://www.britannica.com/event/Lebanese-Civil-War

Lebanese military personnel
1910 births
1977 deaths